The Aqualina Tower is a residential skyscraper in Punta Pacífica, Panama City.

The building is 210 meters tall and has 63 floors. Its construction was carried out by Fajardo Moreno Arquitectos and Btesh & Virzi Promoción Inmobiliaria, which began in 2005 and finished in 2007. It is one of the tallest buildings in the city, surpassing the 200 meters between the other skyscrapers.

See also
List of tallest buildings in Panama City

References

Residential buildings completed in 2007
Residential skyscrapers in Panama City